Trout Lake Township is a civil township of Chippewa County in the U.S. state of Michigan.  The population was 332 at the 2020 census, down from 384 at the 2010 census.

Geography
The township is in southwestern Chippewa County on the Upper Peninsula of Michigan and is bordered to the south and west by Mackinac County. The unincorporated community of Trout Lake is in the southwestern part of the township, near the lake of the same name.

Demographics
As of the census of 2000, there were 465 people, 212 households, and 143 families residing in the township.  The population density was 3.3 per square mile (1.3/km).  There were 479 housing units at an average density of 3.4 per square mile (1.3/km).  The racial makeup of the township was 91.83% White, 5.59% Native American, and 2.58% from two or more races. Hispanic or Latino of any race were 0.22% of the population.

There were 212 households, out of which 19.8% had children under the age of 18 living with them, 59.4% were married couples living together, 5.7% had a female householder with no husband present, and 32.1% were non-families. 29.7% of all households were made up of individuals, and 17.5% had someone living alone who was 65 years of age or older.  The average household size was 2.17 and the average family size was 2.65.

In the township the population was spread out, with 17.8% under the age of 18, 3.9% from 18 to 24, 23.2% from 25 to 44, 31.0% from 45 to 64, and 24.1% who were 65 years of age or older.  The median age was 49 years. For every 100 females, there were 92.9 males.  For every 100 females age 18 and over, there were 99.0 males.

The median income for a household in the township was $28,571, and the median income for a family was $35,536. Males had a median income of $28,500 versus $16,923 for females. The per capita income for the township was $15,221.  About 9.8% of families and 12.8% of the population were below the poverty line, including 17.5% of those under age 18 and 11.0% of those age 65 or over.

References

External links
Trout Lake Township official website

Townships in Chippewa County, Michigan
Townships in Michigan